Yasser Abdullah Nasser Al-Mosailem (born 27 February 1984) is a Saudi Arabian professional footballer who plays as a goalkeeper for Al-Ahli and the Saudi Arabia national team.

Career
Born in Al-Hasa, Al-Mosailem started his career in the youth setups of local club Hajer. On 11 November 2002, Al-Mosailem joined Al-Ahli for a reported fee of SAR200,000. Al-Mosailem was the third player to join Al-Ahli from Hajer following the transfers of brothers Misfer and Taisir Al-Jassim a couple of months earlier. He made his first-team debut in the Federation Cup group stage match against Ohod, which ended in a 3–1 win. Al-Mosailem made his league debut on 22 October 2005 in the 3–0 win against Al-Hazem. He ended his first full season at the club making 21 appearances across all competitions.

In his second season with Al-Ahli, Al-Mosailem was a starter in all 5 matches in the Crown Prince Cup as Al-Ahli won the cup. He also played a role in the Federation Cup. He went on to make 33 appearances in all competitions. He remained as a starter for Al-Ahli until 2012, where he was dropped in favor of Abdullah Al-Mayouf. He made just 24 appearances in 3 seasons for Al-Ahli. On 20 May 2014, Al-Mosailem renewed his contract with the club. On 14 February 2015, in the Crown Prince Cup final, Al-Mosailem came off the bench to save a penalty following Al-Mayouf's dismissal. Al-Ahli went on to win the match and Al-Mosailem won his second Crown Prince Cup. Al-Mosailem eventually regained his starting spot and played a vital role in Al-Ahli's first league title in 32 years. On 23 October 2016, Al-Mosailem was injured in the league match against Al-Nassr and was ruled out for four weeks. On 29 December 2016, Al-Mosailem renewed his contract with Al-Ahli keeping him at the club until 2020.

International career
Young Al Ahli goalkeeper Yasser Al-Mosailem was handed his chance in the national set-up with veterans Mabrouk Zaid and Mohammad Khouja being absent. The 23-year-old custodian produced a string of impressive displays for Al Ahli to earn his place in Helio Anjos' side after helping the Saudi Premier League side to two domestic trophies, and he played the first time on Saudi Arabia national team in 2007 AFC Asian Cup, where Yasser had an outstanding performance, helping the Saudis to reach the final. However, subsequent injuries forced him to be excluded from the national team in major competitions like 2011 and 2015 AFC Asian Cups, and losing the position to Waleed Abdullah.

In May 2018 he was named in Saudi Arabia's squad for the 2018 FIFA World Cup in Russia.

Personal life
Yasser is married and has a son Amar and a daughter Elaph. Yasser has stated that he likes to spend most his time on social media such as Instagram and Snapchat.He is 
a member of Shia Muslim minority of Saudi Arabia.

Career statistics

Club
As of 30 May 2022.

International
Statistics accurate as of match played 25 June 2018.

Honours

Club
Al-Ahli
Saudi Professional League: 2015–16
King Cup: 2011, 2012, 2016
Saudi Crown Prince Cup: 2006–07, 2014–15
Saudi Federation Cup: 2006–07
Saudi Super Cup: 2016
Gulf Club Champions Cup: 2008

International
AFC Asian Cup runner-up: 2007
Star of the season in Al-Ahli: 2017.

See also
List of one-club men in association football

References

Living people
1984 births
Association football goalkeepers
Saudi Arabian footballers
Saudi Arabia international footballers
2007 AFC Asian Cup players
Al-Ahli Saudi FC players
Saudi Professional League players
Saudi First Division League players
Saudi Arabian Shia Muslims
2018 FIFA World Cup players
People from Al-Hasa